"100 Years" is a song by American singer Five for Fighting. It was released on November 17, 2003, as the first single from his third studio album, The Battle for Everything (2004). The single reached number one on the US Billboard Adult Contemporary chart and number 28 on the Billboard Hot 100. In 2007, the song earned a Platinum certification from the Recording Industry Association of America for more than 1,000,000 copies sold. It also charted in Australia and New Zealand, peaking at number 32 in both countries.

Chart performance
"100 Years" peaked on the US Billboard Hot 100 singles charts at number 28, for the week ending May 24, 2004. In December 2004, on the Billboard Year-End Hot 100 singles of 2004 chart, "100 Years" was ranked at number 77 overall for the year.

"100 Years" peaked at number one on the Billboard Adult Contemporary chart for the week ending May 7, 2004. It went on to be the longest-running number-one single of 2004 on the Adult Contemporary chart, staying at number one for 12 non-consecutive weeks. The song spent a total of 52 weeks on the Adult Contemporary chart.

Music video
The music video was directed by Trey Fanjoy and premiered on January 10, 2004. It placed at number 30 on VH1's Top 40 Music Video Countdown of 2004, spending 18 weeks on VH1's weekly Top 20 countdown. In the video, images of Ondrasik singing and playing the song at the piano are intercut with fictional, idealized versions of himself as a 15-year-old boy, a man in his middle 40s, and a 99-year-old man, reflecting the song's lyrics. At the end of the song, Ondrasik meets his older self.

Track listing
Australian CD single
 "100 Years"
 "Sister Sunshine"
 "Maybe I" (acoustic version)
 "100 Years" (acoustic version)

Charts

Weekly charts

Year-end charts

Certifications

Release history

See also
 List of Billboard Adult Contemporary number ones of 2004

References

2003 singles
2003 songs
American soft rock songs
Five for Fighting songs
Music videos directed by Trey Fanjoy
Songs written by John Ondrasik